Manchester F.C. may refer to one of the following football teams:

England
Manchester City F.C., of the Premier League
Manchester United F.C., of the Premier League
Manchester Central F.C., operated from 1928 into the 1930s; now the name of an unrelated amateur club
F.C. United of Manchester, a semi-professional team

Other locations
Manchester 62 F.C., in Gibraltar
Manchester City F.C. (Sierra Leone)
Manchester Congo Mouilla, in the Republic of the Congo

See also
Manchester Rugby Club, originally known as Manchester Football Club, in England